Majed Al-Marshadi (born 1 November 1984) is a footballer. He currently plays as a defender .

Al-Marshadi has made several appearances for the Saudi Arabia national football team, including two qualifying matches for the 2010 FIFA World Cup.

Club career statistics

References

External links

1984 births
Living people
Association football defenders
Saudi Arabian footballers
Al Hilal SFC players
Al-Jabalain FC players
Al-Wehda Club (Mecca) players
Al-Shabab FC (Riyadh) players
Al-Fateh SC players
Al-Lewaa Club players
2015 AFC Asian Cup players
Saudi Arabia international footballers
Saudi First Division League players
Saudi Professional League players
People from Ha'il